Michael Shane Callahan is an American film and television actor. Callahan graduated from Titusville Area High School in 1992 and then went on to graduate from the Art Institute of Pittsburgh in 1995 with a video business degree and a music degree. He has had prominent roles in feature films such as Well Wishes as well as television series including Under the Dome and theatre productions such as True West. Callahan has also produced short films including Acito on the Mound.

Filmography

Film

Television

References

External links
 

American male film actors
American male television actors
Art Institute of Pittsburgh alumni
Living people
Male actors from Florida
Year of birth missing (living people)